Malaventura is a 2011 Mexican drama film directed by Michel Lipkes.

Cast
 Enrique Arias as Jugador de poker 2
 Graciela Castillo as Señora cantina.
 Payaso Clavito as Jugador de poker 3
 Urbano Cruz as Jugador de poker 4
 Francisco Jimenez as Gandalla 2
 Isaac Lopez as Viejo
 José Luis Martínez as Mientamadres 1
 Raul Montelongo as Hombre que canta en la calle
 Guadalupe Nava Nova as Gandalla 1
 El Pajarito as Dueño del bar
 Genaro Rangel as Tendero
 Alejandra Resendis as Chica en el metro
Jesus Zavala as Damian Martínez

References

External links
 

2011 films
2011 drama films
Mexican drama films
2010s Spanish-language films
2010s Mexican films